Flags and symbols of Yorkshire have been used to identify Yorkshire and its related councils through flags and symbols (including coats of arms). This article also includes flags and symbols used by the present and former local authorities covering Yorkshire.

Yorkshire

The Ridings – three traditional geographic and culturally historic areas of Yorkshire

Councils

Administrative county councils prior to 1974
The administrative county councils prior to 1974 covered the traditional geographic historical Ridings of Yorkshire, subject to minor boundary changes of administrative areas in the 1960s along the River Tees area. In each case the councils were granted by letters patent issued by the officers at the College of Arms. The councils of the administrative counties were abolished in 1974 and the coats of arms became obsolete.

Metropolitan and non-metropolitan county councils 1974–1986 / 1974–1996
Following the reorganisation of the administrative county council areas by the Local Government Act 1972, the established three county councils were replaced  on 1 April 1974 by four new county council areas: the metropolitan counties of South Yorkshire (centred on Barnsley), and West Yorkshire (centred on Wakefield), and the non-metropolitan counties of North Yorkshire (centred on Northallerton) together with the non-Yorkshire named Humberside (centred on Beverley). All four of the new 1974 county councils received grants of complete "achievements" of arms consisting of a shield, crest and supporters. 

On 1 April 1986 the two metropolitan county councils in Yorkshire were abolished under the Local Government Act 1985. Administratively, the new county areas legally remained in existence and were from that date administered by the former lower tier metropolitan district councils (City of Wakefield, City of Leeds, City of Bradford, Calderdale (Halifax), Kirklees (Huddersfield), for West Yorkshire, and Barnsley, City of Sheffield, Rotherham and Doncaster, for South Yorkshire). On 1 April 1996 the non-metropolitan county of Humberside was also abolished, being replaced north of the River Humber by new administrative unitary councils, The East Riding of Yorkshire Council (which despite the name did not share the traditional geographic historic area of the former East Riding County Council) centred at Beverley, and Kingston-upon-Hull City Council.

Non-metropolitan district council (unitary authority) from 1996

British Army

See also 
Flying Colours Flagmakers company based in North Yorkshire

References

Yorkshire culture
Yorkshire
Yorkshire